This is a list of rivers in the Santiago Metropolitan Region, Chile. Data in this article has been compiled from the data supplied by GeoNames. It includes all features named "Rio", "Canal", "Arroyo", "Estero" and those Feature Code is associated with a stream of water. This list contains 211 water streams.

Content
This list contains:
 Name of the stream, in Spanish Language
 Coordinates are latitude and longitude of the feature in ± decimal degrees, at the mouth of the stream
 Link to a map including the Geonameid (a number which uniquely identifies a Geoname feature)
 Feature Code explained in 
 Other names for the same feature, if any
 Basin countries additional to Chile, if any

List

 Estero de Dolores3892323STM
 Rio MaipoRío Maipo3880983STM
 Río Puangue3875116STM(Estero Puangue, Estero de Pangue, Estero de Pedegua)
  Rio MapochoRío Mapocho3880596STM(Rio Mapocho, Río Mapocho)
  Río Lampa3885272STM(Estero de Lampa, Rio de Lampa, Río de Lampa)
  Rio ColinaRío Colina3894235STM(Estero Colina, Estero de Colina, Rio Colina, Río Colina)
  Estero de Polpaico3875489STM
  Estero de Chacabuco3895797STM
  Estero de El ArrayanEstero de El Arrayán3891939STM(Cajon de Arrayan, Cajón de Arrayan, Estero Los Arrayanes, Estero de El Arrayan, Estero de El Arrayán, Estero del Arrayan, Estero del Arrayán)
  Rio San Francisco3872210STM
  Rio MolinaRío Molina3879619STM
  Estero de la Yerba Loca3867675STM
  Río Angostura3899602STM
  Rio ColoradoRío Colorado3894031STM
  Rio OlivaresRío Olivares3878097STM
  Rio YesoRío Yeso3867648STM
  Rio VolcanRío Volcán3867968STM(Rio El Volcan, Rio Volcan, Río El Volcán, Río Volcán)
  Río Rapel3873717STM (See afluents in List of rivers of the O'Higgins Region)
 Estero El ExtravioEstero El Extravío3891362STM(Arroyo El Extravio, Estero El Extravio, Estero El Extravío, Estero del Extravio, Estero del Extravío)
 Estero del Rosario3872813STM(Estero El Rosario, Estero del Rosario)
 Estero El Chorrillo3891623STM

  Río del Plomo3875613STM
  Estero de Las Mazas3884191STMI
  Estero de Los Valles3881294STMI
  Estero de Los Campos3882299STMI(Estero de Los Campos, Estero de los Campos)
  Estero Caleu3897285STM
  Estero Rungue3872687STM
  Estero La Margarita3885386STM(Estero La Margarita, Estero Margarita)(CL)
  Estero de La Providencia3884904STM
  Quebrada La Leonera3885467STM(Cajon de la Leonera, Estero La Leonera, Estero Leonera, Quebrada La Leonera)
  Estero Tiltil3869820STM
  Estero de Peldehue3876790STM
  3881559STM
  Canal Batuco3898594DTCH
  Estero Cordillera Ferrosa3893578STM
  Estero Esmeralda3889892STM
  Estero de Las Pircas3884008STM
  Canal de Lo Pinto3882501DTCH
  Estero Leonera3883348STMI
  Estero de CarenEstero de Carén3896673STM
  Estero Los CastanosEstero Los Castaños3882248STM
  Estero Paramillos3877207STMI
  Estero La Leonera3885469STM(Estero La Leonera, Estero Leonera)
  Estero Las Yaretas3883755STM
  Río Lomas Coloradas3882600STM
  Estero El Carrizo3891686STMI
  Río Barros Negros3898647STM
  Estero Manzanito3880630STM(Estero Barros Negros, Estero Manzanito)
  Río Tupungato3868900STM
  Estero de Las Rosas3883922STMI
  El Manzano Estero3891068STMI
  Río Potrerillos3875314STM
  Estero de las Ramadas3873821STMI(Estero de Las Ramadas, Estero de las Ramadas)
  Estero Las Bayas3884599STMI
  Canal de Quilicura3874210DTCH
  Estero Manantial Amargo3880768STM
  Río Tupungatito3868904STM
  Estero de Las Gualtatas3884342STM
  Estero del Mauco3880319STM(Estero del Manco, Estero del Mauco)
  Estero de La VinaEstero de La Viña3883523STM
  Estero El Risco3890535STM
  Rio del CepoRío del Cepo3895909STM(Estero del Cepo, Rio de Capo, Rio del Cepo, Río de Capo, Río del Cepo)
  Estero Las Tinajas3883883STMI
  Estero Los Recauquenes3881420STM
  Río Montenegro3879432STMI
  Estero Covarrubias3893341STM
  Rio AzufreRío Azufre3899051STM(Estero del Azufre, Rio Azufre, Río Azufre)
  Rio MuseoRío Museo3879141STM(Estero del Museo, Rio Museo, Río Museo)
  Estero de CuyuncaviEstero de Cuyuncaví3892783STM(Estero Curacavi, Estero Curacaví, Estero de Cuyuncavi, Estero de Cuyuncaví)
  Estero Rabicano3873885STM
  Estero de Zapata3867531STM
  Canal El Carmen3891705DTCH
  Canal Santo Domingo3871320DTCH
  Canal San Carlos3872323DTCH
  Estero de Miraflores3879719STM
  Estero de Las Cruces3884423STM
  Estero Los Panguiles3881637STM
  Estero de La Jarilla3885563STM(Estero de La Jarilla, Estero de la Jarilla)
  Estero FrioEstero Frío3889292STM
  Estero Chacayal3895735STM
  Estero Maitenes3880928STM
  Estero Parraguirre3877148STM
  Estero del ZanjonEstero del Zanjón3867566STM
  Canal de Las Mercedes3884178DTCH
  Canal Valledor3868649DTCH
  Canal San JoaquinCanal San Joaquín3872138DTCH
  Estero de Los AngelesEstero de Los Ángeles3882422STM(Estero Angeles, Estero Anjeles, Estero de Los Angeles, Estero de Los Ángeles)(CL)
  Canal de Ibacache3887406DTCH
  Estero de Las Vacas3883810STM
  Estero del Relbo3873522STM
  Estero de Quempo3874386STM
  Canal Maria PintoCanal María Pinto3880485DTCH
  Canal de La Rinconada3884709DTCH
  Canal de La PataguillaCanal de La Patagüilla3885072DTCH
  Estero del Durazno3892120STM
  Río Potrerillos3881518STM
  Estero de Las Mariposas3884200STM(Estero de La Mariposa, Estero de Las Mariposas)
  Estero Aucayes3899156STM
  Estero de AmesticaEstero de Améstica3899783STM
  Canal de OchagaviaCanal de Ochagavía3878370DTCH
  Canal de Ortuzur3877965DTCH
  Estero del Sauce3871202STM
  Estero de Las Higueras3884323STM(Estero de Las Higueras, Estero de la Higuera, Estero de las Higueras)
  Canal de Manzano3880618DTCH
  Canal de Mallarauco3880851DTCH
  Canal de El Colorado3891567DTCH
  Estero de Los Mayos3881767STM(Estero de Los Magos, Estero de Los Mayos, Estero de los Mayos)
  Canal San Francisco3872226DTCH
  Estero Las Monjas3884146STM(Estero Las Monjas, Estero las Monjas)
  Canal Maurino3880295DTCH
  Canal de Los Italianos3881987DTCH
  Canal de Las Higueras3884324DTCH
  Canal de La Esperanza3885998DTCH
  Estero FrioEstero Frío3889291STM
  Estero del Manzano3880612STM(Estero El Manzano, Estero del Manzano)
  Canal San Bernardo3872346DTCH
  Canal de Las Perdices3884037DTCH
  Canal de La Luz3885426DTCH
  Estero GuayacanEstero Guayacán3888313STM
  Estero La Paloma3885120STM(Estero La Paloma, Estero de la Paloma)
  Canal San JoseCanal San José3872099DTCH
  Canal de Mallarauco3880850DTCH
  Canal Los Bajos3882372DTCH
  Estero de La Marquesa3885379STM(Estero Marquesa, Estero de La Marquesa)
  Estero Peralillo3876551STM
  Estero Yeguas Muertas3867708STM
  Río del Plomo3875612STM
  Canal Picano3876337DTCH
  Estero de La Crianza3886185STM
  Canal San Bernardo3872347DTCH
  Estero Agua FriaEstero Agua Fría3900482STM
  Estero de Las Quinguas3883969STM
  Estero del Medio3880195STM
  Estero El Coironal3891573STM
  Rio ClarilloRío Clarillo3894580STM(Estero El Clarillo, Rio Clarillo, Río Clarillo)
  Canal de Espejo3889866DTCH
  Canal Puangue3875118DTCH
  Canal LarrainCanal Larraín3884691DTCH
  Canal de Agua Clara3900564DTCH
  Estero de San JoseEstero de San José3872090STM
  Canal Trebulco3869259DTCH
  Canal del Paico3877776DTCH
  Canal de La Calera3886403DTCH
  Canal El Rosario3890474DTCH
  Canal El Marco3891058DTCH
  Estero del Sauce3871201STM
  Estero Los Olguines3881674STM
  Canal LarrainCanal Larraín3884690DTCH
  Estero El Tollo3890284STM
  Canal Castillo3896251DTCH
  Estero MelocotonEstero Melocotón3880089STM
  Estero La Calchona3886414STM
  Canal de Santa Rita3871439DTCH
  Canal Talagante3870305DTCH
  Estero El Bajo3891917STM
  Canal Aguirrano3900371DTCH
  Estero El Gato3891321STMA
  Estero Rincon Los BueyesEstero Rincón Los Bueyes3873175STMI
  Canal Pabellones3877861DTCH
  Canal ChocalanCanal Chocalán3894909DTCH
  Estero San Alfonso3872446STM
  Estero Las AnimasEstero Las Ánimas3884640STMI(El Pangal, Estero Las Animas, Estero Las Ánimas)
  Estero de Coyanco3893321STM
  Canal La Sirena3884296DTCH
  Estero Caldera3897320STM
  Estero de ChocalanEstero de Chocalán3894908STM(Estero Acule, Estero Chocalar, Estero Chocalár, Estero de Chocalan, Estero de Chocalán)(CL)
  Canal Carmelito3896623DTCH
  Estero San NicolasEstero San Nicolás3871870STM
  Estero de CuncumenEstero de Cuncumén3892972STM
  Estero San Gabriel3872199STM
  Estero El CajonEstero El Cajón3891799STMI
  Estero Manzanito3880629STM
  Estero de Quincanque3874048STM
  Estero Popeta3875448STM
  Estero Puro3874580STM
  Estero el Sauce3871199STM
  Estero Salto de Agua3872499STM
  Estero del Agua3900622STM
  Estero de Paine3877736STM
  Estero del Loro3882477STMI
  Estero Colina3894238STM(Estero Colina, Rio de Colina, Río de Colina)
  Estero La Monja3885302STMI
  Estero Los Guindos3882026STM
  Estero Las Ramadillas3883954STM
  Estero CaletonEstero Caletón3897288STMI
  Estero del Cobre3894517STM
  Estero Lingo Lingo3883136STM
  Estero del Prado3875214STM
  Estero San Pedro3871809STM
  Estero Loica3882678STMI
  Estero Piuquencillo3875733STM
  Rio ClaroRío Claro3894573STM
  Estero Licancheo3883264STMI
  Estero de las Diucas3892385STM
  Estero del Peuco3876394STM(Estero Peuco, Estero de Peuco, Estero del Peuco, Rio Peuco, Río Peuco)
  Estero NilhueEstero Ñilhue3878642STMI(Estero Nihue, Estero Nilhue, Estero Ñihue, Estero Ñilhue)
  Estero Yesillo3867654STM
  Estero de Corneche3893549STM
  Estero Las Chacarillas3884489STMI
  Estero del Diablo3892523STM
  Estero QuinicabenEstero Quiñicabén3874018STM
  Estero de Piche3876314STM
  Estero El Membrillo3891033STM(Estero El Membrillo, Estero del Membrillo)
  Estero del HuillinEstero del Huillín3887540STM
  Estero Las Palmas3884084STM(Estero Las Palmas, Estero Palmas)
  Rio BlancoRío Blanco3898214STM
  Rio NegroRío Negro3878786STM
  Rio BarrosoRío Barroso3898642STM
  Rio ArhuellesRío Arhuelles3899364STM
  Rio AlvaradoRío Alvarado3899859STM
  Rio Cruz de PiedraRío Cruz de Piedra3893228STM

See also
 List of lakes in Chile
 List of volcanoes in Chile
 List of islands of Chile
 List of fjords, channels, sounds and straits of Chile
 List of lighthouses in Chile

Notes

References

External links
 Rivers of Chile
 Base de Datos Hidrográfica de Chile
 

Santiago